Political kidnapping is kidnapping which is conducted to obtain political concessions from security forces or governments.

Rise

Political kidnapping has been happening for more than a millennia. Occasionally, political kidnapping has vast impacts, such as the kidnapping of Chiang Kai-Shek creating the Second United Front and uniting China against Japan at the start of World War 2.

There were series of kidnapping of senior diplomats during the 1960s and 1970s. By the end of the 1960s, political kidnappings were evidently profitable.

For a long period, political kidnapping was usually a Latin American phenomenon, with some few overlooked incidents in Europe. After the 1990s, when the interest of tourists and businessmen increased in Asian and Pacific countries, the kidnappings also became a means to support the political motives of newly established dissidents groups, such as Abu Sayyaf's group, which has conducted numerous political kidnappings.

Worldwide

In the Middle East 
Arab history features a concept known as 'desert diplomacy'. Per the Gulf Research Center, "The objective of this traditional activity was to apply pressure on hostile tribesmen by issuing demands, the fulfillment of which would lead to the safe return of their son or daughter. Demands would be, as they are today, financial, moral or political; although hostages would rarely be killed. Nevertheless, retention of the hostage for some years was not unusual. The kidnappings taking place in Iraq today are ones far departed from the traditional practices of Arab (and indeed, other nations ) tribal warfare which were governed by a strict protocol, ensuring decent, gentle and safe treatment of the captives."

Various groups in the Palestinian Resistance and in the Lebanese Civil War (1975-1990) employed political kidnapping as a method.

Al-Qaeda began using political kidnappings around 2004.

In Iran 
The Islamic Revolutionary Guard Corps (IRGC) has kidnapped many journalists, including Ruhollah Zam, who fled to France and was kidnapped back to Iran for his execution, according to Reporters Without Borders. Iran has 'kidnapped' the bodies of dead journalists, holding them until relatives deny that the journalists were killed by security forces.

Activists, especially female activists, have been kidnapped by Iran. Masih Alinejad was to be the victim of a kidnapping conspiracy.

In Latin America 
Political kidnapping happened in Latin America before the 1970s, but it was then that the number of kidnappings accelerated.

According to the New York Times, "So far this year [August 1970], there have been at least 18 successful or attempted kidnappings in Latin America. Among Latin Americans, the victims have included a former President of Argentina, the Foreign Minister of Guatemala and the former Foreign Minister of Colombia. Among foreigners, the victims have included ambassadors, consuls, labor, commercial and military attaches and even consultants with no governmental positions." Kidnappings were used as a tactic by urban guerrilla fighters. Stated goals included release of political prisoners, for ransom, embarrassment of officials, and straining ties between countries.

Methodology 
Often, though not exclusively, kidnappers attack while targets are travelling in cars. A car or truck carrying terrorist forces will force the target's car off the road, proceeding to hold them at gunpoint until they surrender. Frequently, cars used are stolen then abandoned, which hampers police investigations.

Notable incidents

References

Sources
 
 
 
 https://www.jstor.org/stable/25117137?seq=1

Kidnapping
Political violence